The Sunshine Coast Regional District is a regional district in British Columbia, Canada. It is located on the southern mainland coast, across Georgia Strait (part of the Salish Sea) from Vancouver Island. It borders on the qathet Regional District to the north, the Squamish-Lillooet Regional District to the east, and, across Howe Sound, the Metro Vancouver District to the south. The regional district offices are located in the District Municipality of Sechelt.

Geography
The majority of the Sunshine Coast is sparsely populated. The Coast Mountains make up the inland area. Population is concentrated along the coast. Midway up the coast, beginning at the town of Sechelt, the coastal area forms a peninsula separated from the inland area by Sechelt Inlet. The 2016 census reported a total population of 29,970 persons living on a land area of 3,778.17 km2 (1,458.76 sq mi).

The Sunshine Coast is typically accessed via boat or plane; no roads connect the district with the rest of the province. From Vancouver, ferries run from Horseshoe Bay to Gibsons across Howe Sound. At the northern end of the peninsula, ferries run from Earl's Cove to Saltery Bay.

Communities

District municipality
Sechelt - Pop 10,200

Town
Gibsons - Pop 4,605

Indian government district
Sechelt (Part) - Pop 819

Indian reserves
Chekwelp 26
Chekwelp 26A
Schaltuuch 27

Unincorporated
Roberts Creek - Pop 3,421
Halfmoon Bay
Madeira Park
Garden Bay
Egmont
Hopkins Landing

Sources Statistic Canada Census.  Area A revised  from 2,678 (2016)

Demographics

Note: Totals greater than 100% due to multiple origin responses.

Provincial Parks
Mount Richardson Provincial Park
Tetrahedron Provincial Park
Spipiyus Provincial Park

See also
Sunshine Coast (British Columbia)

Notes

References
Sources
Community Profile: Sunshine Coast Regional District, British Columbia; Statistics Canada

Notes

External links

 
Sunshine Coast